Larry Cochran is a Canadian psychologist and Professor of Counseling Psychology at the University of British Columbia. In his writings he argues that life cycles can be observed.

Bibliography
 Career Counseling: A Narrative Approach 
 The sense of vocation: About the choice of vocation; life choices 
 Becoming an agent: patterns and dynamics for shaping your life 1994 
 Portrait and Story: Dramaturgical Approaches to the Study of Persons 
 Position and the Nature of Personhood:An Approach to the Understanding of Persons 
 The Meaning of Grief: A Dramaturgical Approach to Understanding Emotion

References

 Plots of time: an inquiry into history, myth, and meaning Allen Tilley, p. 43. 
 Review of Career counseling: A narrative approach. Anne Marshall, Canadian Psychology. Vol 42(2), May 2001, 145–147.

External links
 

Canadian psychologists
Academic staff of the University of British Columbia
Year of birth missing (living people)
Living people